Karanveer "Kinni" Singh Grewal (born 24 April 1993) is an Indian-born Norwegian professional footballer who plays as a defender. He is currently playing for Åskollen in the Norwegian lower leagues.

Club career
Grewal grew up in Tranby and started his career in Lier IL. He made his debut for Strømsgodset's first team in 2012, when he made one appearance in Tippeligaen and two appearances in the Norwegian Cup, all as a substitute. He was not offered a new contract with Strømsgodset after the 2012 season, and joined Mjøndalen in February 2013. He joined the 2. divisjon side Asker on loan for the rest of the season in July 2013. In 2014 Grewal and Mjøndalen won promotion to Tippeligaen.

Grewal left the club in the winter market 2016/17.

International career
Grewal made his debut for the Norwegian under-19 team in February 2012 as a substitute against Sweden (1–0). He managed one more appearance that year, coming on as a substitute against Ukraine (1–1) in April.

Career statistics

References

External links
Karanveer Grewal at Footballdatabase

1993 births
Living people
Indian emigrants to Norway
People from Lier, Norway
Norwegian footballers
Norway youth international footballers
Association football defenders
Strømsgodset Toppfotball players
Mjøndalen IF players
Asker Fotball players
Eliteserien players
Norwegian First Division players